Travis Fitzwater (born May 22, 1981) is an American politician. He is a member of the Missouri Senate, and a former member of the Missouri House of Representatives, having served in the House from 2015 to 2023. He is a member of the Republican Party.

Electoral History

State Representative

State Senate

References

Living people
Republican Party members of the Missouri House of Representatives
1981 births
21st-century American politicians